HouseQuake is a 2009 American documentary film written and directed by Karen Elizabeth Price.

Synopsis 
This documentary film covers the Democratic Party's successful attempt to take control of the United States House of Representatives from Republicans in 2006. It focuses on the strategy employed by the Democratic Congressional Campaign Committee Chairman Rep. Rahm Emanuel and follows Democratic challengers and Republican incumbents in seven races across the country through election night.  The significant gains made by Democrats constituted a wave election. Democrats subsequently lost control to Republicans in 2010. Emanuel became President Barack Obama's first Chief of Staff in 2009 and was elected Mayor of Chicago in 2011.

Subjects

 Naftali Bendavid
 Donna Brazile
 George Bush
 James Carville
 Wesley Clark
 Emanuel Cleaver
 Bill Clinton
 James Clyburn
 Charlie Cook
 Tammy Duckworth
 Brad Ellsworth
 Rahm Emanuel
 Diane Farrell
 Newt Gingrich
 Stanley Greenberg
 Baron Hill
 John Hostettler
 Steny H. Hoyer
 Frank Luntz
 Tim Mahoney
 John McCain
 Jerry McNerney
 Joe Negron
 Barack Obama
 Norman Ornstein
 Nancy Pelosi
 Richard Pombo
 Charles Rangel
 Tom Reynolds
 Peter Roskam
 Phyllis Schlafly
 Christopher Shays
 Heath Shuler
 Mike Sodrel
 Chris Van Hollen
 Richard Viguerie
 Josh Kurtz

Reception
The Washingtonian Made note that the documentary "takes a behind-the-scenes look at how the Democrats made a comeback in 2006" by following and illustrating how Rahm Emanuel "orchestrated one of the country’s most historic congressional elections."  The film opens by showing Emanuel's appointment as chairman of the Democratic Congressional Campaign Committee and follows with a brief summation of what factors made the 2006 midterm elections important for the Democrats.

Political analyst Bill Schneider wrote in National Journal that the film's most startling scene is not written for the film, but was a story told by author Naftali Bendavid when Bendavid "recounts an incident at the end of Bill Clinton's first presidential campaign, when staff members gathered to celebrate victory."

Recognition
The film was a 2009 winner of the 'Directorial Discovery Award' at Rhode Island International Film Festival.

References

External links
 
 HouseQuake at the Internet Movie Database
 HouseQuake at Brainstorm Media

2009 documentary films
2009 films
2000s English-language films